Brent Pierce (born July 7, 1969) is a Canadian curler and coach from New Westminster, British Columbia.

Career
Pierce is a 1987 provincial junior champion skip, and a four-time provincial champion, former national and world champion playing third for Greg McAulay. Pierce last represented BC at the Brier in 2009 with the Sean Geall team.

Pierce's 1987 Vancouver team of Darin Fenton, Bryan Miki, and Ross Graham won the provincial championships, qualifying them for the 1987 Canadian Junior Curling Championships in Prince Albert, Saskatchewan. They finished the round-robin with a 7–4 record. This qualified them for the playoffs, where the lost in the semifinals to Team Ontario, skipped by Wayne Middaugh.

Pierce didn't make it back to a national tournament until 1998 when he had joined forces with Greg McAulay as his third. That year, they won the B.C. provincial championship, qualifying them for the 1998 Labatt Brier. At the Brier, they finished with a 7–4 record. This forced them into a tiebreaker, which they ended up losing to Team Saskatchewan, skipped by Rod Montgomery.

Two years later, Team McAulay won the BC championships once again, and this time also won the 2000 Labatt Brier. They defeated Russ Howard's New Brunswick team in the final. This qualified the team to the World Curling Championships, where they represented Canada. They claimed the gold medal at the event, defeating Sweden's Peja Lindholm.

Pierce also appeared in the Brier again in 2009 as third for the Sean Geall team, placing 5th with a 6–5 record. On the team were Kevin Recksiedler at second and lead Mark Olson. After that season Pierce began skipping his own team. Pierce won the BC Mens’ Championship in 2022, going on to represent BC at the Brier.

Awards
British Columbia Sports Hall of Fame: inducted in 2002 with all of 2000 Greg McAulay team, Canadian and World champions

Personal life
Pierce works as a senior sales representative. He is married and has two children.

References

External links
 
 

Curlers from British Columbia
Living people
World curling champions
Brier champions
1969 births
Canadian male curlers
Sportspeople from New Westminster
Canadian curling coaches